James Fielden (born 9 May 1978 in Halifax, West Yorkshire) is an English professional rugby league footballer for Keighley Cougars in National League One.

He played for London Broncos and Huddersfield Giants in the Super League and also for Doncaster Dragons and Rochdale Hornets.

He is the older brother of Wigan Warriors and Great Britain international Stuart Fielden.

References

1978 births
Living people
Doncaster R.L.F.C. players
English rugby league players
Huddersfield Giants players
Keighley Cougars players
London Broncos players
Rochdale Hornets players
Rugby league players from Halifax, West Yorkshire
Rugby league props